Lok Ma Chau is the northwestern terminus in Lok Ma Chau on the Lok Ma Chau Spur Line, a branch line of the  of Hong Kong's MTR network, which was built to alleviate the immigration checkpoint between Hong Kong and mainland China's Shenzhen at Lo Wu station.

On 4 February 2020, MTR has temporarily closed this station and suspended train service to and from this station following the Government's measures to contain the outbreak of the COVID-19 pandemic. The station reopened on the 8th January, 2023.

History 
Lok Ma Chau station, together with the spur line, opened on the afternoon of 15 August 2007. The adjoining Futian Checkpoint station on Line 4 of the Shenzhen Metro opened on 28 June 2007. Like Lo Wu station, this station is located in the Frontier Closed Area, hence access is restricted to passengers with a permit or a passport and visa to mainland China.

On 2 December 2007, this station was leased to the MTR Corporation, along with the entire KCR network, by the Kowloon-Canton Railway Corporation, for a period of 50 years, giving Lok Ma Chau station the shortest station life under KCR operation.

Station layout

Lok Ma Chau Spur Line Control Point 
The Lok Ma Chau Spur Line Control Point is an immigration control point connected with the Lok Ma Chau station. It is the second control point along the land border of Hong Kong to have a railway access. The control point is connected via a pedestrian footbridge to the Futian Port, an immigration port of entry of the PRC, and from there to Shenzhen Metro's Futian Checkpoint station.

The control point was opened on 15 August 2007 together with the opening of the KCR Lok Ma Chau Spur Line between Lok Ma Chau and Sheung Shui station. The crossing consists of a cable-stay double-deck pedestrian bridge across the Sham Chun River, which forms the border between Hong Kong and the rest of the PRC. The lower deck handles pedestrians heading from Hong Kong to Futian Port, while the upper deck handles those coming from Futian Port to Hong Kong. Immigration facilities are located within the station building on both ends of the bridge. Electricity to the Hong Kong half of the bridge is provided by CLP Power, and Hong Kong's jurisdiction and law enforcement on the bridge also terminate at the midpoint, as on the Lo Wu Bridge.

The control point is open between 06:30 and 22:30, unlike the 24-hour vehicle Lok Ma Chau Control Point nearby. Later pedestrian crossing can be made at Lo Wu Control Point, until 00:00.

Although the Lok Ma Chau Spur Line Control Point is often referred to as a railway crossing, it is in fact a pedestrian crossing, unlike the Lo Wu Control Point, where no bus or any other public transport can reach. Furthermore, there is no through-train service, as the railway line is not connected with the railways in mainland China. And although the bulk of the users are train passengers, the Lok Ma Chau pedestrian crossing can also be reached by bus, taxi and mini bus from various parts of the New Territories.

The Lok Ma Chau transport interchange is located to the east of Lok Ma Chau station and is connected with the station via footbridges. The entrance and exit between the station and the interchange are guarded by the police as the area is located within the Frontier Closed Area.

The checkpoint has 2 road public transport services both to/from the West (MTR trains to the checkpoint run to/from the East). Those road services are:

 Bus B1
 Green minibus 75

Both run to/from Yuen Long town centre from where other destinations in Western New Territories can be reached by road and rail. Among public transport destinations from Yuen Long is also bus 968 to Hong Kong Island via the Western Harbour Crossing.

Bus B1 and green minibus 75 operate via San Tin PTI. San Tin PTI offers many more connections than Lok Ma Chau Spur Line Checkpoint. KMB bus routes 76K, 276B, B1, N73, A43P, R41, X43, 178R (R41, X43 and 178R available Events Only) and all serve San Tin Public Transport Interchange.

See also
 Lo Wu Control Point

References

External links 

Lok Ma Chau
MTR stations in the New Territories
East Rail line
China–Hong Kong border crossings
Closed Area
Railway stations in Hong Kong opened in 2007
Former Kowloon–Canton Railway stations